TUA may stand for:

 Tokyo University of Agriculture, Japan
 Tokyo University of the Arts, a national university in Tokyo, Japan
 TOW Under Armor, armored missile systems
 Trinity University of Asia, a university in Quezon City, Philippines
 Tulcan Airport in Tulcán, Ecuador
 Turkish Space Agency, (Türkiye Uzay Ajansı, TUA)
 The Umbrella Academy, a comic series by Gerard Way
 Lemony Snicket: The Unauthorized Autobiography, a 2002 novel

See also
 Tua (disambiguation)